Norma Belleza (born May 3, 1939) is a Filipino painter. She was born in San Fernando, Pampanga. Back then, her family was composed of billboard designers. Married to the Filipino artist, Angelito Antonio, with their children Fatima Baquiran, Emil Antonio, and Marcel Antonio. She studied at the University of Santo Tomas in 1962 and obtained her bachelor's degree in Fine Arts.

Career

In her early years, she painted dark and depressing paintings. Her paintings then turned into brightly colors and detailed work on folk genre, including women vendors, potters and workers. Figurative works placed emphasis on her subject’s physical appearance. After obtaining her bachelor's degree, she resided with her husband Angelito Antonio. Being idle for 10 years, she had her solo works exhibited at Metro Gallery in 1976. Ever since then, she had nine one-person shows exhibited at different galleries such as: Luz Gallery and ABC Gallery.

See also
 Angelito Antonio
 Fatima Baquiran

Bibliography

CCP Encyclopedia of Philippine Art, Vol 4. Manila: Cultural Center of the Philippines, 1994.
Kintanar, Thelma and Ventura, Sylvia Mendez. Self-Portraits: Twelve Filipina Artists Speak. Quezon City: Ateneo de Manila Press, 1999.
20th Century, 1st Ed, Vol II; CCP Vol IV; Archipelago Magazine Vol. 4, 1977

References

1939 births
Living people
Filipino painters
People from San Fernando, Pampanga
Artists from Pampanga
Filipino women painters
University of Santo Tomas alumni